Horizon Airport  is a public-use airport located nine miles (14 km) south of the central business district of San Antonio, a city in Bexar County, Texas, United States. It is privately owned by Toudouze Investments, Inc.

Facilities and aircraft 
 Runway 11/29: 2,360 x 80 ft (719 x 24 m), Surface: Turf
 Runway 16/34: 2,250 x 100 ft (686 x 30 m), Surface: Turf

For the 12-month period ending January 28, 2004, the airport had 2,800 aircraft operations, 100% of which were general aviation.

References

External links 

Airports in Texas
Transportation in Bexar County, Texas
Buildings and structures in Bexar County, Texas